Lloyd Frederick "Pop" Klein (c. 1900 – October 14, 1968) was a coach of football and basketball at the high school and collegiate levels.

He began his career as a football and basketball at Crete High School where he accumulated an 89–19 record in football and 200–54 in basketball. He won a state basketball championship at Crete in 1928.

Klein then moved on to become the head football coach at the University of Nebraska–Kearney where led them to a 42–21–1 in eight seasons. Klein was also the Nebraska–Kearney head men's basketball coach for two seasons (1935–1937) where he led the teams to a 15–15 record. After that, he became an assistant football coach at the University of Nebraska–Lincoln for 14 seasons. During his first year in Lincoln, he stepped in to be the men's basketball coach for one year due to the head coach being ill.

Klein died at the age of 68, on October 14, 1968, at his home in Prescott, Arizona.

Head coaching record

College football

References

External links
 Nebraska–Kearney Hall of Fame profile

Year of birth uncertain
1968 deaths
Nebraska Cornhuskers football coaches
Nebraska Cornhuskers men's basketball coaches
Nebraska–Kearney Lopers football coaches
Nebraska–Kearney Lopers men's basketball coaches
High school basketball coaches in Nebraska
High school football coaches in Nebraska